Steven Cree (born 29 February 1980) is a Scottish film, television and theatre actor. He is best known for his role as Ian Murray in the Starz television series Outlander. His other work includes the films Brave (2012), 300: Rise of an Empire (2014), Maleficent (2014), 51 Degrees North (2014), Churchill (2017), and the television series Lip Service.

Early life
Cree was born on 29 February 1980 in Kilmarnock, East Ayrshire, Scotland, the son of a local kitchen and bathroom fitter. Upon completion of Secondary School, he attended Langside College in Glasgow for a year before applying, and being accepted to, the Royal Scottish Academy of Music and Drama (now known as the Royal Conservatoire of Scotland). at RSAMD, he was signed by a London Talent agent and moved to the city after completing school.

Career
Cree began his professional career in 2001 with the guest starring role of Gerry in an episode of CBBC's weekly comedy series G-Force. He went on to guest star in an episode of BBC's medical drama Doctors in 2002, and ITV's prison drama Bad Girls in 2003. 2006 saw Cree guest star in BBC's medical drama Holby City and Sky 1's football drama Dream Team. Cree returned to BBC's Doctors in 2007 with a second guest role in series nine, and he had a guest role in series eleven of the popular crime drama Silent Witness.

In 2009, Cree made the transition from television to feature films by starring as Antonio Vivaldi in Condor Pictures' Vivaldi, the Red Priest and director Craig Lyn's short film Closing Doors. He was then cast in episode five of ITV's six part mini-series Identity, a crime drama following a newly formed police unit investigating identity left cases. Cree worked with actor/director Noel Clarke twice in 2010 as he was featured in the thriller 4.3.2.1., which followed four friends targeted by a smuggling ring, and the comedy Huge, which focused on a would-be stand-up comedy duo. E4's teenage science-fiction drama Misfits saw Cree return to episodic television with a season two guest spot that same year. He was then featured in award-winning Kurdish director Chiman Rahimi's sort film Rojin. 2011 saw Cree feature in the supernatural thriller film The Awakening and in director Tom Harper's short film The Swarm.

2012 brought Cree a recurring role on BBC Three's groundbreaking drama Lip Service. He portrayed Ryder, Sam Murray's police partner, opposite Heather Peace. His next performance was as featured guest star Corporal Vince Grafton in a series two episode of ITV's murder mystery series Vera. Throughout 2012, Cree had minor roles in major motion pictures such as Disney's John Carter and Brave (animated; voice work), British thriller Tower Block, and the Noel Clarke comedy The Knot.

Actor turned director Sam Hoare's 2013 debut film, Having You, featured Cree in the role of Paul. That same year, he portrayed Lennox in Kenneth Branagh's stage production of Macbeth at the Manchester International Festival. The production sold out, but was broadcast live to audiences in Manchester, England and around the globe on 20 July 2013 as part of the National Theatre's NT Live broadcasts. That same year, director Ruth Sewell cast Cree in the lead role of Matt in her short film Fish Love, which was featured at the London Short Film Festival.

2014 saw Cree return to television in series two of the BBC's crime drama Shetland, based on the best-selling book series by Ann Cleeves. He next tackled minor roles in Disney's live action film Maleficent, which focuses on the villain of their 1959 classic Sleeping Beauty, and the made-for-television film Marvellous. He returned to television to guest star as Miras in the two-part Series Two premier of BBC's family drama Atlantis, which only ran for two seasons before being cancelled. It was announced in 2014 that Cree has been cast in the role of Ian Murray in Starz time travel drama Outlander, based upon the best-selling book series from author Diana Gabaldon. The role is recurring and will continue throughout the series.

Cree was cast in the guest role of Levesque in BBC's popular drama The Musketeers in 2015, portraying Porthos' brother-in-law in the series two episode. That same year, he guest starred in the "mockumentary" Hoff the Record alongside actor David Hasselhoff. He went on to roles in several feature films such as Colin Kennedy's Swung, Legacy, 51 Degrees North, and short film The Rat King, which was nominated for Best Short at the Edinburgh International Film Festival.

In 2016, Cree returned to crime drama Silent Witness in the two-part season nineteen episode "Flight", which focused on the murder of a critic of Muslim fundamentalism. Once again reuniting with director Noel Clarke, Cree was featured as Brick in the feature length crime drama Brotherhood. He then portrayed Scottish war hero and Navy meteorologist Captain James Stagg in 2017's D-Day film Churchill, which shed light on the little known fact that the invasion date had been moved due to weather.

Science fiction/fantasy film The Titan (2018), starring Sam Worthington and Tom Wilkinson, has Cree portraying Major Tom Pike in Earth's dystopian future. In 2018, in his second turn in a science-fiction film, Cree voiced the character ATRi in Hasraf Dulull's 2036 Origins Unknown, which explored the origins of an unknown object on the surface of Mars. That same year, the Netflix drama Outlaw King, starring Chris Pine as Robert the Bruce, featured Cree as Bruce's brother-in-law Sir Christopher Seaton. In addition to his roles in films and television, Cree wrote and starred in a short film entitled The Little Princess (2018), which was co-awarded Best Short Narrative film at the San Luis Obispo International Film Festival. He and director Jason Maza raised funds for the film on Kickstarter, a popular crowdfunding platform.

Cree would go on, the next year, to portray Andrew Bentham in BBC Two's political drama MotherFatherSon, opposite Richard Gere (in his first major television role). He would then join the cast of ITV's female centric drama Deep Water as series regular character Joe Kallisto. Late fall 2019 saw Cree feature in the latest feature film installment of the Terminator franchise, Terminator: Dark Fate, opposite Linda Hamilton and Arnold Schwarzenegger.

Early 2020 saw him star as Chief Constable Stuart Collier, opposite Robert Carlyle, in Sky One's political thriller Cobra. He also completed filming on Ruth Platt's ghost story Martyrs Lane, which is scheduled to premiere at Fantasia Film Festival's 25th anniversary edition the next year. In 2021 Cree debuted as popular Scottish character Gallowglass in the second season of Sky One's television drama A Discovery of Witches, which is based upon Deborah Harkness' book series of the same name. He will reprise the role in season three of the series. Cree completed filming on horror feature The Twin, alongside fellow A Discovery of Witches cast member Teresa Palmer, in June 2021.

Filmography

Television

Film

Theatre

Voice

Awards and nominations

References

External links

1980 births
Living people
20th-century Scottish male actors
21st-century Scottish male actors
People from Kilmarnock
Scottish male film actors
Scottish male television actors
Scottish male video game actors
Scottish male voice actors